The College of Electrical & Mechanical Engineering (CEME) is a constituent college of the National University of Sciences and Technology, located in Rawalpindi, Pakistan. The campus is on the main Peshawar Road, near the M-2 motorway terminal.

The college is the main training institute for the Pakistan Army Corps of Electrical and Mechanical Engineering officers and enlisted ranks.

Overview
The college is divided into two sections: Academic and Military. The Academic section falls under the supervision of the Academic Services Group - they are responsible for assembling the curriculum, making class schedules, and appointing teaching staff for Undergraduate, Post Graduate, and Doctoral Studies.

The Military Section of the college is housed mainly in the old Polytechnic buildings to the east of the campus. Sports facilities at EME include three tennis courts, a basketball court, a squash court, badminton court, football grounds, cricket pitches, a swimming pool, horse riding club, and two gymnasiums. The EME cricket and squash team won the Inter-NUST title in 2016. The campus includes all on-campus facilities, hostel accommodation, auditorium, academic blocks, conference halls, sports complex, and mess facilities. The library is fully computerized with a collection of 70,000 volumes.

History 
On 1 April 1957, the College of Electrical and Mechanical Engineering was established at Quetta as EME School. In 1969, EME School was given the status of a college and civilians were also admitted. In 1981, a BSc program started at EME and a few years later in April 1984, EME moved to its current location in Rawalpindi from Quetta. From 1984 to 1993, it was affiliated with the University of Engineering & Technology, Lahore.

In 1977, the polytechnic institute at Peshawar Road, Rawalpindi, was closed down by Gen Zia-ul-Haq, and was converted into EME College.

In 2003, EME received ISO 9001-2000 certification. Its Ph.D. program started in 2006.

Location 
The campus is located on Peshawar Road, 13 km from the heart of Rawalpindi and 15 km from the center of Islamabad. The campus consists of training blocks, living accommodations for students, faculty, and staff, a stadium, auditorium, cafe, mess, sports complex, gymnasium, swimming pool, assault course, mosque, post office, bank, grocery store, and a welfare shop.

Departments 
 Department of Electrical Engineering
 Department of Mechanical Engineering
 Department of Computer & Software Engineering
 Department of Mechatronics Engineering
 Department of Basic Sciences & Humanities
 Department of Engineering Management

Hostels 
The college has its own hostels located on-campus having a collective accommodation capacity of up to 820 cadets.

 Aitazaz Shaheed Hostel (named after Aitazaz Hasan Shaheed)
 Iqbal Hostel
 Liaqat Hostel
 Jinnah Hostel
 Abu Bakar Hostel
 Amna Hostel
 Khadija Hostel

Student societies 
 EME Olympiad Association
 Institute of Electrical and Electronics Engineers CEME (IEEE CEME)
 Sports and Adventure Society (SAS)
 Society for Promotion of Art and Literature (SPAL)
 NUST Volunteers Club (NVC)
 American Society of Mechanical Engineers (EME Chapter)
 Society of Automotive Engineers (SAE EME Chapter)
 NUST Automotive Group (NUSTAG)
 EME Aviator's Club (EAC) 
 EME Media Club
EME Dramatics Club
Google Developers Student Club CEME NUST (DSC CEME)
Emerging Technologies Research Lab (ETL)

Events

NERC 
The Department of Mechatronics Engineering hosts the National Engineering Robotics Contest (NERC) each year. Students, enthusiasts, and hobbyists from all over Pakistan participate in NERC and compete using their robots in different categories. NERC is considered as the biggest robotics competition in Pakistan.

COMPPEC 
The Computer Project Exhibition and Competition (COMPPEC) is hosted by the Department of Computer Engineering each year. It is a national level event with students participating from all over Pakistan.

Student achievements
The Devrim II is the first-ever hybrid car in Pakistan, designed and fabricated by students of the National University of Sciences and Technology, Pakistan (NUST), in 2010. In 2012, students from the Department of Mechanical Engineering recorded a 72 km/L mileage for a road-acceptable mini-car at the Eco-marathon held in Kuala Lumpur, Malaysia.

The "Lipton Talent Hunt" contest organized by Unilever in 2013 was won by students of the Electrical Engineering department. In 2019, Team Pagri participated in the Agriculture Robotics Competition in China and stood second on a national level.

In August 2019, a startup called Respond.io, with offices in 4 different countries, with the Department of Computer Engineering as the CTO, along with two other co-founders from El Salvador and Canada respectively - raised $1.8 million (USD) to fund the development and innovation of their eponymous SaaS-based business messaging platform used by more than 40,000 organizations worldwide.

EME Alumni Association (EMEAA)
The EME Alumni Association (EMEAA) was formally initiated in the year 2005 to provide a platform to ex-students. Over the years, EMEAA has become an institution of its own, based on a strong commitment by the volunteers. Currently, more than 2500 alumni members are registered with the association. The association is headed by a President and General Secretary, supported by three committees (Scholarship Evaluation, Fund Raising, and Alumni Network & Media Committee). EMEAA has a stable financial aid program that aims to support needy students of the college. There are two sessions in a year and the grants are given after a strict evaluation process. EMEAA arranges alumni reunions every year in the college and all the alumni and ex-faculty members are invited to the event. EMEAA also holds career counselling and publishes a study guide for students.

SAE EME Chapter 
The SAE EME Chapter is a student organization run by the Department of Mechanical Engineering. It has held a number of engineering and technology competitions that include the boat-building competition and the popular egg-drop challenge. It holds workshops relating to subjects mainly from the field of mechanical engineering.

See also
National University of Science and Technology, Pakistan
Pakistan Military Academy
Army Medical College
College of Aeronautical Engineering
Military College of Engineering (Pakistan)
Military College of Signals

References

External links 
 EME official website
 Pakistan Armed Forces

National University of Sciences & Technology
Universities and colleges in Rawalpindi District
Engineering universities and colleges in Pakistan
Military education and training in Pakistan
Military academies of Pakistan
Educational institutions established in 1957
1957 establishments in Pakistan